Spencer Fullerton Baird Review of American birds in the Museum of the Smithsonian Institution: pt. 1  Smithsonian Institution Washington, 1864–1872.online Birds described in this work include Sinaloa wren, Pacific wren, wood thrush and  black-capped gnatcatcher.
Birds described in 1864 include Tongan megapode, Livingstone's turaco, plain gerygone, lesser swamp warbler, ashy storm petrel, 
Elliott Coues A critical review of the family Procellaridae  Proceedings  Philadelphia Academy of Natural Science.
Lost land of Lemuria postulated.
Thomas C. Jerdon publishes The Birds of India. Volume II, Part I and The Game Birds and Wildfowl of India 
Death of Christian Ludwig Brehm
Ongoing events
John Gould The birds of Australia; Supplement 1851–69. 1 vol. 81 plates; Artists: J. Gould and H. C. Richter; Lithographer: H. C. Richter
John Gould The birds of Asia; 1850-83 7 vols. 530 plates, Artists: J. Gould, H. C. Richter, W. Hart and J. Wolf; Lithographers:H. C. Richter and W. Hart
The Ibis

References

Bird
Birding and ornithology by year